Devotion is a 2022 American biographical war film based on the 2015 book Devotion: An Epic Story of Heroism, Friendship, and Sacrifice by Adam Makos, which retells the comradeship between naval officers Jesse Brown and Tom Hudner during the Korean War. It is directed by J. D. Dillard and written by Jake Crane and Jonathan Stewart. The film stars Jonathan Majors as Brown and Glen Powell as Hudner, along with Christina Jackson, Daren Kagasoff, Joe Jonas, Nick Hargrove, Spencer Neville, and Thomas Sadoski in supporting roles.

Devotion premiered at the Toronto International Film Festival in IMAX at the Ontario Place Cinesphere on September 12, 2022, and was released by Columbia Pictures through Sony Pictures Releasing in the United States on November 23, 2022. While it received positive reviews from critics and audiences, it grossed $21.8 million worldwide against a $90 million budget.

Plot
In early 1950, Lieutenant Tom Hudner transfers to Fighter Squadron 32 (VF-32) at Quonset Point Naval Air Station, where he meets Ensign Jesse Brown, the only black member of the unit. Hudner integrates well into the squadron, which is assigned F4U-4 Corsairs – powerful planes with a reputation for fatal accidents if not handled properly. After Brown's car breaks down, Hudner starts giving him rides and eventually meets his wife Daisy and their young daughter Pam. The Browns are doing well, but struggle with racist neighbors, and Brown has resorted to shouting racist abuse at himself in the mirror for motivation before missions.

VF-32 passes their carrier tests with the Corsair and transfer to the USS Leyte, which is deployed to the Mediterranean Sea to deter Soviet aggression. Before they leave, Daisy has Hudner promise that he will be there for Jesse. On the voyage, squadron member Mohring is killed in a crash while attempting to land a Corsair. Hudner questions why Mohring did not follow instructions, but Brown explains that one cannot always follow directions – if Brown had solely done what he was told, he would have been stopped early in his career by the many racist superior officers who wanted him to fail.

The unit has shore leave in Cannes, France, where Brown encounters actress Elizabeth Taylor on the beach and secures invitations for the squadron to a casino, impressing them. After Hudner gets in a drunken fight with a Marine who had previously harassed Brown, Brown tells Hudner not to fight his battles for him, but simply to be there for him. Brown is given an expensive watch by Leyte'''s black crewmen, who admire him for his work.

The next day, the squadron is informed that war has broken out between North and South Korea, and Leyte is redeploying to support the South. In November 1950, VF-32 arrives in Korea and learns that Chinese troops have entered the war on the North Korean side and begun to push American forces back. The squadron deploys to destroy a pair of bridges on the Yalu River between China and North Korea, though they are only permitted to fire on the Korean side of the border. Brown and Hudner fight off a MiG-15 fighter jet while the others attack the bridges, but one remains standing. While Hudner orders a retreat in the face of anti-air fire from the Chinese side of the river, Brown disobeys him and attacks the bridge solo, successfully crippling it.

Hudner's after-action report praises Brown but also mentions that he was acting against orders, which Brown tells Hudner will be used as an excuse to deny him promotions for the rest of his career, despite Hudner's attempt to revise the report. On another mission to support besieged Marines at Chosin Reservoir (including the Marine who earlier harassed Brown), Brown's Corsair is crippled, and he is forced to crash-land in a clearing in the mountains of North Korea. Hudner sees that Brown is alive but trapped in his cockpit and deliberately crashes his own plane in the clearing in order to aid Brown. Though he puts out an engine fire, Hudner is unable to extract the wounded Brown from the wreckage, and Brown dies shortly after a Marine helicopter arrives to assist him. Back on Leyte, Hudner's commander determines that it is too risky to attempt to recover Brown's body from the Chinese-controlled area, and VF-32 (minus the injured Hudner) is instead sent on a "funeral flight" to destroy the downed Corsairs, with Brown's corpse still inside.

Several months later, a heartbroken Hudner receives the Medal of Honor from President Harry Truman for his attempts to save Brown. Hudner speaks with Daisy after the ceremony and apologizes for failing to rescue her husband. Daisy remarks that she only made him promise to be there for Jesse, not to save him, and Hudner tells her that Jesse's final words were about how much he loved her.

The film ends with a note that Brown's remains have never been recovered from North Korea, and that Hudner and Brown's families remain close friends to this day.

Cast
 Jonathan Majors as Ensign Jesse Brown
 Glen Powell as Lieutenant Junior Grade Tom Hudner
 Christina Jackson as Daisy Brown
 Thomas Sadoski as Lieutenant Commander Dick Cevoli
 Daren Kagasoff as Bill Koenig
 Joe Jonas as Marty Goode
 Spencer Neville as Bo Lavery
 Nick Hargrove as Carol Mohring
 Boone Platt as Buddy Gill
 Dean Denton as USS Leyte (CV-32) Captain T.U. Sisson
 Thad Luckinbill as Peters
 Joseph Cross as Charlie Ward
 Serinda Swan as Elizabeth Taylor
 Bill Martin Williams as President of the United States Harry S. Truman

Production
In March 2018, Black Label Media optioned the rights to Devotion on Glen Powell's recommendation, coming aboard as a producer and commitment to play Tom Hudner. In December 2019, it was announced that Jonathan Majors was cast as Jesse Brown and J. D. Dillard was set to direct. In September 2020, it was announced that Sony Pictures would distribute the film under the Columbia Pictures label in North America, while STXfilms would handle international sales and distribution for the film. In February 2021, Serinda Swan was cast as Elizabeth Taylor.

Dillard felt a close personal connection to the subject as the son of a naval aviator himself, relied on stories related by his father as the lone black man in a predominantly white aviation community. In an interview with Deadline Hollywood, he said, "Both technically and socially, they both dealt with isolation and there’s so many pieces there that I think ultimately just became the DNA of the film." Dillard's father also visited the set and served as a technical advisor for the film. His contribution to the film is recognized by a separate card in the end credits.

Powell, who read Adam Makos' book when it first came out in 2015, brought it to Molly Smith of Black Label to option and went to visit Thomas J. Hudner Jr. shortly before he died in 2017. He was struck by the photographs and mementos of Jesse Brown around the house, remarking that, "I saw what weight that was on him. It wasn’t a celebration, it was a constant reminder of a friend he lost and I carried that weight into this role."

Principal photography began on February 4, 2021, in Savannah, Georgia. Filming also took place in Charleston, South Carolina, East Wenatchee, Washington, Statesboro, Georgia, and from March 17 to April 13, 2021, at the Statesboro-Bulloch County Airport.

Dillard was determined to create practical effects using real aircraft as much as possible, including several F4U Corsairs, an AD Skyraider, two F8F Bearcat fighters, one of the only remaining flyable HO5S-1 helicopters, and a MiG-15. Dillard hired aerial stunt coordinator Kevin LaRosa, who created the flight sequences for Top Gun: Maverick. A modified L-39 Albatros trainer was used as an air-to-air camera platform. Interior footage of actors flying the Bearcat was created using a Hawker Sea Fury with its rear seat modified to resemble a Bearcat cockpit and visible parts of the aircraft painted like a VF-32 Bearcat, allowing actors to simulate piloting the aircraft during actual aerial maneuvers.

Music
Chanda Dancy, a graduate of USC Thornton School of Music, composed the movie soundtrack, which was released by Lakeshore Records. The soundtrack was shortlisted for Best Original Score on Dec 21, 2022 for the 95th Academy Awards, but did not get the ultimate nomination on Jan 24, 2023.

Joe Jonas and Khalid wrote and performed a duet to the end credits song called Not Alone, but the single was not part of the soundtrack, and not shortlisted for Academy Award for Best Original Song.

Track listing

ReleaseDevotion had its world premiere at the Toronto International Film Festival in IMAX at the Ontario Place Cinesphere on September 12, 2022, and also as the opening night film of Film Fest 919 on October 19, 2022. It had its U.S. premiere at the 58th Chicago International Film Festival on October 22, 2022. It was theatrically released on November 23, 2022. It was originally scheduled to be released in limited theaters on October 14, 2022, followed by a wide expansion on October 28, 2022. It was released as a Netflix Exclusive in Australia and New Zealand. 

Home mediaDevotion was released on Digital HD and streamed on Paramount+ on January 8, 2023 in North America with Paramount themselves taking over distribution instead of Sony. It was released in the UK via Amazon Prime on January 20, 2023, in UHD HDR10+, with releases on Ultra HD Blu-ray, Blu-ray and DVD on February 28, 2023 by Paramount Home Entertainment.

Reception
 Box office 
In the United States and Canada, Devotion was released alongside Strange World and Glass Onion: A Knives Out Mystery, as well as with the wide expansions of The Fabelmans and Bones and All, and was projected to gross $7–8 million from 3,405 theaters over its five-day opening weekend. The film made $1.8 million on its first day, including $615,000 from Tuesday night previews. It went on to debut to $5.9 million in its opening weekend and $9 million over the five days, finishing fourth. It was the overall lowest-grossing Thanksgiving weekend box office in decades. In its sophomore weekend the film made $2.7 million, finishing fourth.

 Critical response 
On the review aggregator website Rotten Tomatoes, 80% of 118 critics' reviews are positive, with an average rating of 6.7/10. The website's critics consensus reads, "Honoring real-life history while delivering impactful drama, Devotion is a straightforward biopic elevated by standout performances from a talented cast." Metacritic, which uses a weighted average, assigned the film a score of 66 out of 100, based on 30 critics, indicating "generally favorable reviews". Audiences polled by CinemaScore gave the film an average grade of "A–" on an A+ to F scale, while those at PostTrak gave the film an overall 91% positive score.

Matthew Creith from Screen Rant wrote "Stylized and cultured, Devotion'' soars when least expected and is brought to life by its talented ensemble cast led by Jonathan Majors and Glen Powell."

Accolades

References

External links
 
 
 

2022 films
2022 action drama films
2020s American films
2020s English-language films
American action drama films
American war drama films
Black Label Media films
STX Entertainment films
Columbia Pictures films
Stage 6 Films films
Cultural depictions of Elizabeth Taylor
Cultural depictions of Harry S. Truman
Films about friendship
Films about racism in the United States
Films about the United States Navy
Films directed by J. D. Dillard
Films set in 1950
Films set in 1951
Films set in Cannes
Films set in Rhode Island
Films set in Washington, D.C.
Films set in the Mediterranean Sea
Films set on aircraft carriers
Films shot in Savannah, Georgia
Films shot in South Carolina
Films shot in Washington (state)
Korean War aviation films
IMAX films
War films based on actual events